Glenton Stuurman (born 10 August 1992) is a South African cricketer. He made his international debut for the South Africa cricket team in February 2021.

Career
Stuurman was included in the South Western Districts cricket team squad for the 2016 Africa T20 Cup. He was the leading wicket-taker in the 2017–18 CSA Provincial One-Day Challenge tournament for South Western Districts, with 12 dismissals in five matches. In September 2018, he was named in Eastern Province's squad for the 2018 Africa T20 Cup. He was the leading wicket-taker in the 2018–19 CSA 3-Day Provincial Cup with 39 dismissals in eight matches.

In November 2020, Stuurman was named in South Africa's squad for their limited overs series against England. In December 2020, Stuurman was named in South Africa's Test squad for their series against Sri Lanka. In January 2021, he was named in South Africa's Twenty20 International (T20I) squad for their series against Pakistan. He made his T20I debut for South Africa, against Pakistan, on 13 February 2021.

In April 2021, he was named in Eastern Province's squad, ahead of the 2021–22 cricket season in South Africa. In December 2021, Stuurman was named in South Africa's Test squad for the series against India. In January 2022, he received a further call-up to the Test side, for their tour of New Zealand. He made his Test debut on 17 February 2022, for South Africa against New Zealand.

References

External links
 

1992 births
Living people
South African cricketers
South Africa Test cricketers
South Africa Twenty20 International cricketers
Border cricketers
Eastern Province cricketers
South Western Districts cricketers
People from Oudtshoorn
Cricketers from the Western Cape